The 2017 Chattanooga Mocs football team represented the University of Tennessee at Chattanooga in the 2017 NCAA Division I FCS football season as a member of the Southern Conference (SoCon). The Mocs were led by first-year head coach Tom Arth and played their home games at Finley Stadium in Chattanooga, Tennessee. They finished the season 3–8 overall and 3–5 in SoCon play to tie for sixth place.

Schedule

Game summaries

vs Jacksonville State

at LSU

UT Martin

at VMI

Western Carolina

Furman

at Mercer

The Citadel

at Samford

at Wofford

East Tennessee State

Ranking movements

References

Chattanooga
Chattanooga Mocs football seasons
Chattanooga Mocs football